SK 48 is a fossilised skull of the species Paranthropus robustus. It was found at Swartkrans, South Africa, in 1948 by palaeontologist Robert Broom. Estimated to be about 1.8 million years old, it is characterised by a robust appearance, bulging and continuous brow, broad flat face and a deep jaw with large chewing teeth/muscle attachments.

The mandible SK 23 was discovered at the same time and in the same location. Even though studies indicate that it came from a separate individual, the two fossils are considered so closely related that they can be studied together. The mandible is also very robust and contains a complete dentition.

See also
 List of fossil sites (with link directory)
 List of hominina (hominid) fossils (with images)

References

External links
Image of SK 48

External links

Paranthropus fossils
Quaternary fossil record